Wat Chedi Liam ("Temple of the Squared Pagoda"), formerly known as Wat Ku Kham ("Temple of the Golden Stupa"), is one of the wats in the ancient Thai city of Wiang Kum Kam, now part of present-day Chiang Mai.

History
The temple was built c. 1287 and remained in use during the early Lan Na period after the new city of Chiang Mai had been established by King Mangrai the Great.

Renovation
The current buildings are from a renovation in 1908 CE  by a Burmese trader. Because of this many of the decorations of the wat are Burmese in style. For example, all but one of the Buddha images on the chedi are wearing the yellow Burmese colourings rather than the white Thai colours.

The chedi was also renovated in 1992 CE when a number of other improvements were made to the site. Not all of these improvements were popular, nor were some needed repairs carried out. Despite its great age the wat is used in much the same way as later wats (for example, there is a weekend market there).

Architecture

The Chedi (Cetiya) is a five-tiered design common in the early Lanna period and shows clear influence of the Mon Haripunchai design. Each corner of the chedi is guarded by a large, outward facing lion, and there are Buddha statues showing different mudras on four of the tiers of the Chedi. The main hall decorations are in very good condition both inside and out.

References
 History of Wiang Kum Kam & Ancient remains - Anonymous
 Oliver Hargreave: Exploring Chiang Mai, City, Valley & Mountains. Within Books, 4th Edition, 2013. 

Chedi Liam
Religious buildings and structures completed in 1287
History of Chiang Mai